Combined nuclear and steam propulsion system (CONAS) is used on the  guided missile cruisers.

Complementary to the nuclear component, there are two conventional boilers installed as a backup in case of reactor failure. Both components can drive two geared steam turbines, generating 120,000 hp (89 MW), at two prop shafts.

References

Marine propulsion
Steam power